Edward Pearce Casey (1864–1940) was an American designer and architect, noted for his work in Washington, D.C. and New York City.

Early life and education
Edward Pearce Casey was born June 18, 1864, in Portland, Maine; where his father, Brigadier-General Thomas Lincoln Casey, served during the Civil War. Edward was educated at the Emerson Institute of Washington, D.C.; and graduated from the School of Mines of Columbia University; he received the degree of C.E. in 1886 and that of architect in 1888. He studied also at the Ecole des Beaux Arts in Paris, France.

Prior to completion of his schooling, Casey served in the 7th Regiment of the New York National Guard, where the portrait photo accompanying this article was taken, c. 1885.

Career and later life
In 1892, Casey replaced Paul J. Pelz as architect of the Library of Congress, whose construction his father directed until his death in 1896. In 1893, he was one of the six equal prize winners in the New York City Hall competition; and in 1900 won the first prize for a design for Taft Bridge over Rock Creek in Washington, D.C. In 1901, he won another design competition, for a design for the Ulysses S. Grant Memorial on the National Mall in Washington, D.C.

Soon after completion of the Grant Memorial, Casey moved to New York City, where he continued his architectural practice. In 1905 and 1906, Casey designed a new façade for a rebuild of the rectory at the Episcopal Church of the Incarnation in Manhattan. Casey died on January 2, 1940, and is buried in the family plot at the Casey Farm in Rhode Island.

References

External links
 Edward Pearce Casey Archival card catalog. Held by the Department of Drawings & Archives, Avery Architectural & Fine Arts Library, Columbia University.

1864 births
1940 deaths
Columbia School of Mines alumni
New York National Guard personnel
19th-century American architects
Architects from Portland, Maine
American alumni of the École des Beaux-Arts
Architects from New York City
20th-century American architects